The Love Epidemic is a 1975 Australian semi-documentary about venereal disease directed by Brian Trenchard-Smith. It incorporates clinical case studies and sex health instruction with comedy sketches.

It was shot on 16mm for $33,000 and blown up to 35mm for theatrical release.

Cast
Michael Laurence
Ros Spiers
Peter Reynolds
Grant Page
Tim Lynch
John Ewart
Barry Lovett
Jane Lister
Luda Apinys
Ken Doyle
Billy Thorpe and the Aztecs

Release
In January 1975 two members of the cast, Luda Apinys and Ken Doyle, sought an injunction to have the film withdrawn on the grounds that it was a pornographic film and they had only agreed to make an educational one. Their attempt was unsuccessful.

The movie was rated "R". According to Trenchard-Smith the film "did okay... getting its money back and making a small profit."

References

External links

The Love Epidemic at Oz Movies

1975 films
Films directed by Brian Trenchard-Smith
Australian sex comedy films
1970s English-language films
1970s Australian films